Omary Ahmad Badwel (born 5 March 1969) is a Tanzanian CCM politician and Member of Parliament for Bahi constituency since 2010.

References

1969 births
Living people
Tanzanian Muslims
Chama Cha Mapinduzi MPs
Tanzanian MPs 2010–2015
Azania Secondary School alumni